The 1989 Walker Cup, the 32nd Walker Cup Match, was played on August 16 and 17, 1989, at Peachtree Golf Club, Atlanta, Georgia. The event was won by the Great Britain and Ireland team, 12½ to 11½. It was the Great Britain and Ireland team's third win in the Walker Cup and their first in the United States. Of the previous 31 matches, the United States had won 28, lost 2 and had tied once, at Baltimore Country Club in 1965.

Great Britain and Ireland had taken an 11–5 lead after the second-day foursomes, needing just 1½ points from the 8 afternoon singles matches. However, the United States staged a recovery and won 5 and halved 2 of the first 7 matches. That meant that if Jay Sigel beat Jim Milligan in the final match, the result would be a tie and the United States would retain the Cup as defending holders. Sigel was 3-up after 11 holes and still 2-up after 15. Milligan won the 16th hole after pitching close and then won the 17th after chipping in, leveling the match. Both players took bogey 5s at the final hole to leave the match halved and to give Great Britain and Ireland a 12½–11½ victory.

Format
The format for play on Wednesday and Thursday was the same. There were four matches of foursomes in the morning and eight singles matches in the afternoon. In all, 24 matches were played.

Each of the 24 matches was worth one point in the larger team competition. If a match was all square after the 18th hole extra holes were not played. Rather, each side earned ½ a point toward their team total. The team that accumulated at least 12½ points won the competition. If the two teams were tied, the previous winner would retain the trophy.

Teams
Ten players for the United States and Great Britain & Ireland participated in the event plus one non-playing captain for each team.

United States

Captain: Fred Ridley
David Eger
Robert Gamez
Ralph Howe
Kevin Johnson
Greg Lesher
Doug Martin
Eric Meeks
Phil Mickelson
Jay Sigel
Danny Yates

Allen Doyle was selected for the team but withdrew because of injury and was replaced by Greg Lesher.

Great Britain & Ireland
 & 
Captain:  Geoff Marks
 Craig Cassells
 Russell Claydon
 Stephen Dodd
 Andrew Hare
 Peter McEvoy
 Garth McGimpsey
 Jim Milligan
 Eoghan O'Connell
 Darren Prosser
 Neil Roderick

Wednesday's matches

Morning foursomes

Afternoon singles

Thursday's matches

Morning foursomes

Afternoon singles

References

Walker Cup
Golf in Georgia (U.S. state)
Walker Cup
Walker Cup
Walker Cup